Staci Michelle Yandle (born July 27, 1961) is a United States district judge of the United States District Court for the Southern District of Illinois.

Biography

Yandle received a Bachelor of Science degree in political science in 1983 from the University of Illinois. She received a Juris Doctor in 1987 from the Vanderbilt University School of Law. From 1987 to 2003, she was an associate with the law firm of Carr, Korein, Schlichter, Kunin, Montroy, Glass & Bogard. From 2003 to 2007, she was a partner with The Rex Carr Law Firm LLC. At this firm she was the first woman and African American partner. Here Yandle focused her practice on personal injury, nursing home negligence, and medical malpractice. From 2007 to 2014, she was a solo practitioner in O'Fallon, Illinois. When she was a solo practitioner, she focused on civil litigation in federal and state courts. In addition to her practice of law, she served on the Illinois Advisory Committee to the United States Commission on Civil Rights from 1992 to 1996, and by appointment on the Illinois Gaming Board, from 1999 to 2001. She has also served on the board of governors of the American Association for Justice and the St. Clair County Bar Association. She is a former president of the Metro East Bar Association.

Federal judicial service 

On January 16, 2014, President Barack Obama nominated Yandle to serve as a United States district judge of the United States District Court for the Southern District of Illinois, to the seat being vacated by Judge John Phil Gilbert, who assumed senior status on March 15, 2014. She received a hearing before the United States Senate Committee on the Judiciary on March 12, 2014.  On April 3, 2014 her nomination was reported out of committee by a 17–1 vote. On June 12, 2014, Senate Majority Leader Harry Reid filed for a motion to invoke cloture on the nomination. On Monday, June 16, 2014 the United States Senate invoked cloture on her nomination by a 55–37 vote. On Tuesday, June 17, 2014, her nomination was confirmed by a 52–44 vote. She received her judicial commission on June 19, 2014. Yandle was sworn in on August 21, 2014.

Notable cases 

In United States v. Iyman Faris Yandle denied a motion seeking to take away citizenship from Iyman Faris on July 11, 2018. Faris became a naturalized citizen in 1999. He was prisoned after pleading guilty to his involvement to a 2003 terrorism plot to cut the cables of the Brooklyn Bridge. He was sentenced to 20 years. It was argued to take away his citizenship claiming that he willfully misrepresented himself to earn citizenship. Yandle rejected the argument on the basis that there is no evidence on the record to support this. Yandle's order was not the end of the suit, as on February 3, 2020, she sided with the government in revoking his citizenship, citing there had been clear evidence given.

Personal life 

In the fall of 1984 Yandle was diagnosed with a brain aneurism that needed emergency attention. Her prognosis warned her that she might lose her sight, ability to talk, and that she needed to leave law school. However, she left the hospital 10 days later to return to Vanderbilt in January. Yandle's medical journey led her to come out as a lesbian.

Yandle is openly gay. She is the first openly gay judge in the Seventh Circuit, which covers Illinois, Indiana and Wisconsin. She also is the first African-American district judge ever to sit on the federal bench in the Southern District of Illinois.

See also 
 List of African-American federal judges
 List of African-American jurists
 List of first women lawyers and judges in Illinois
 List of first women lawyers and judges in the United States
 List of LGBT jurists in the United States

References

External links

Staci Michelle Yandle's senate hearing questions
Judge Staci M. Yandle's Case Management Procedures

1961 births
Living people
African-American judges
American women lawyers
Illinois lawyers
Judges of the United States District Court for the Southern District of Illinois
LGBT African Americans
LGBT appointed officials in the United States
LGBT judges
LGBT lawyers
LGBT people from Illinois
People from Centreville, Illinois
People from Carlyle, Illinois
United States district court judges appointed by Barack Obama
University of Illinois alumni
Vanderbilt University Law School alumni
21st-century American judges
21st-century American women judges
American lesbians